Smut may refer to:

 Smut (fungus), a group of plant parasitic fungi
 Smut (comics), an adult British comic title dating back to the 1980s
 A colloquial term for obscenity in general or pornography in particular
 Jimmy Means, a former NASCAR driver nicknamed "Smut"
"Smut", a song by Tom Lehrer from his 1965 album That Was the Year That Was, referencing the colloquial meaning of the term